Drewton is a hamlet in the East Riding of Yorkshire, England.

History

In the 1086 Domesday Book Drewton is written as "Drowetone". The manor, in the East Riding Hundred of Cave,  comprised 11 households, 6 villagers and 5 smallholders, with 2 ploughlands. Lordship of the manor of Drewton had passed to Robert Malet, who also became Tenant-in-chief.

The Domesday settlement at Drewton became a partly deserted medieval village (DMV), possibly at the time of the 14th-century Black Death. There was a further decline in the second half of the 17th century to leave only Drewton Manor and a farmhouse. Four houses were added in the mid-20th century. The Estate, which today holds game shoots, was valued at £6 million when offered for sale in 2004.

In 1823 Drewton was in the Wapentake of Harthill, and, with Everthorpe, had a population of 177, six of which were farmers and another a 'gentlewoman'. The settlement was the location of South Cave railway station on the Hull and Barnsley Railway.

At Drewton is a naturally formed stone monolith called St Austin's Stone. Bulmer's History and Directory of East Yorkshire repeats what it says is a commonly held view that Drewton's name might derive from 'Druids' town', and mentions the "huge monolith" of "St Augustine's Stone" that was supposed to be connected with Druid worship, and as the place where Saint Augustine preached to the Saxons, although stating that no record of the saint exists of him ever visiting Yorkshire. A Roman road which crossed the Humber at Brough passed through or near Drewton, the Roman occupation leaving many remains in the settlement.

See also
Brantingham
Hotham
North Cave

References

External links

Hamlets in the East Riding of Yorkshire